Pimelea confertiflora is a species of flowering plant in the family Thymelaeaceae and is endemic to north Queensland. It is a shrub with densely hairy young stems, elliptic or narrowly elliptic leaves and spikes of yellowish-green or yellow, tube-shaped flowers.

Description
The leaves are hairy, the hairs on the lower surface longer than those on the upper surface. Flowering occurs in most months.

Taxonomy
Pimelea confertiflora  was first formally described in 2017 by Anthony Bean in the journal Austrobaileya from specimens collected by Paul Irwin Forster near Mount Misery in 1990. The specific epithet (confertiflora) means "crowded flowers".

Distribution and habitat
This pimelea grows on hillsides with rocky outcrops between the Windsor Tableland, Undara Volcanic National Park and Mareeba in north Queensland.

References

confertiflora
Flora of Queensland
Malvales of Australia
Plants described in 2017
Taxa named by Anthony Bean